Anthony Thompson  is a Gaelic footballer who plays for Naomh Conaill and, formerly, the Donegal county team.

He plays at wing back.

He won one All-Ireland Senior Football Championship and four Ulster Senior Football Championships with his county.

Playing career

Club
Playing alongside John Gildea in midfield, Thompson scored three points, including two frees, in the final as Naomh Conaill won their first ever Donegal Senior Football Championship in 2005. He was sent off in the final of the 2009 Donegal Senior Football Championship, which his team lost to St Eunan's. His club won the 2010 County Final and went on to reach the final of the 2010 Ulster Senior Club Football Championship, knocking out Cavan champions Kingscourt, Monaghan champions Clontibret and Tyrone champions Coalisland along the way.

He played for his club in the final of the 2015 Donegal Senior Football Championship. They won.

He played for his club in the final of the 2019 Donegal Senior Football Championship. They won, following a second replay.

He played for his club in the final of the 2020 Donegal Senior Football Championship. They won, following extra-time and a penalty shoot-out.

Inter-county
Thompson was a member of the Donegal squad that won the 2007 National Football League.

Under the management of Jim McGuinness, and in McGuinness's first season in charge, Thompson won the 2011 Ulster Senior Football Championship, playing and scoring two points in the final against Derry. He played again when Donegal returned to the final in 2012. Donegal defeated Down in that game. Normally a quiet member of the team, in the All-Ireland Senior Football Championship quarter-final defeat of Kerry at Croke Park on 5 August 2012, he knocked teammate Patrick McBrearty out of the game with his head. He played in the 2012 All-Ireland Senior Football Championship Final against Mayo. Donegal won. Though nominated for an All Star he was not successful, but was selected as a replacement All Star for the Football Tour of New York when others such as Colm McFadden and Frank McGlynn were unable to attend.

Thompson won his third Ulster Senior Football Championship in 2014, scoring one point against Monaghan in the final. He played 52 of the 54 league and championship matches under McGuinness's management, missing only two league games against Cork and Kerry due to injury; only goalkeeper Paul Durcan played in more games under McGuinness.

Under the management of Rory Gallagher, who succeeded McGuinness ahead of the 2015 season, Thompson continued to play for his county. For much of Donegal's 2015 campaign, he commuted from his work base in Essex, England. He moved back to Ireland in 2016. His last appearance for Donegal during Gallagher's ill-fated managerial reign was against Dublin in the 2016 All-Ireland Senior Football Championship quarter-final defeat at Croke Park, a game in which he scored one point.

Thompson returned to the fore under the management of Declan Bonner. He collected his fourth and final Ulster SFC in 2018, appearing as a second half substitute for Odhrán Mac Niallais in the final against Fermanagh. However, he did not return after the winter.

Style of play
Thompson has been considered by national media to be "an invaluable leader", a "selfless player" and "one of the most iconic number 5s in the county's history".

His virtuoso performance in the 2012 All-Ireland Senior Football Championship Final was highlighted by The Irish Times which noted how he "seemed to shepherd the play exactly to his liking and moved through the fare in that unhurried, three-quarters pace style of his", at one stage "loitering in front of David Clarke's goal, a de facto full forward doing what good front men do: keeping quiet as a church mouse and waiting to be spotted". Despite playing at wing back, he was the first person to congratulate Michael Murphy following his early goal in that game, having raced through to offer support to his full-forward team captain.

Honours
Donegal
 All-Ireland Senior Football Championship: 2012
 Ulster Senior Football Championship: 2011, 2012, 2014, 2018
 National Football League Division 1: 2007
 National Football League Division 2: 2011

Naomh Conaill
 Donegal Senior Football Championship: 2005, 2010, 2015

Individual
 All Star nomination: 2012
 Gaelic Life Ulster Club All Star: 2019

References

External links
 Official profile
 Cavan v Donegal - Ulster GAA Football Senior Championship Preliminary Round: 20 May 2012; Anthony Thompson, Donegal, in action against Damien Reilly, Cavan

1986 births
Living people
Donegal inter-county Gaelic footballers
Irish expatriate sportspeople in England
Naomh Conaill Gaelic footballers
Winners of one All-Ireland medal (Gaelic football)